Menyanthaceae is a family of aquatic and wetland plants in the order Asterales.  There are approximately 60-70 species in six genera distributed worldwide.  The simple or compound leaves arise alternately from a creeping rhizome.  In the submersed aquatic genus Nymphoides, leaves are floating and support a lax, umbellate or racemose inflorescence. In other genera the inflorescence is erect and consists of one (e.g., Liparophyllum) to many flowers. The sympetalous, insect-pollinated flowers are five-parted and either yellow or white. The petals are ciliate or adorned with lateral wings. Fruit type is a capsule.

Species of Menyanthaceae are found worldwide. The genera Menyanthes and Nephrophyllidium grow only in the northern hemisphere, while Liparophyllum and Villarsia occur only in the southern hemisphere. Nymphoides species have a cosmopolitan distribution.

Menyanthaceae species are of economic importance as ornamental water garden plants, with Nymphoides being most commonly traded. The practice of growing non-native water plants has led to several species becoming naturalized or invasive.

Dimorphic heterostyly occurs in all genera but Liparophyllum.  In addition, four species of Nymphoides are dioecious.

Genera
Plants of the World Online accepts the following genera:
 Liparophyllum Hook.f.
 Menyanthes L.
 Nephrophyllidium Gilg
 Nymphoides Ség.
 Ornduffia Tippery & Les
 Villarsia Vent.

References

External links

Menyanthaceae of Mongolia in FloraGREIF

 
Asterales families